Friends & Lovers is a 1999 American romantic-drama film directed and co-written by George Haas about a group of twentysomethings on a ski trip. It stars Stephen Baldwin, Claudia Schiffer and Robert Downey, Jr.

Plot
As Christmas season approaches, Ian is invited by his father, Richie, to join him for a skiing holiday in Park City, Utah. Ian persuades several of his friends to come along. There is Jon, who brings along his German girlfriend, Carla, but has competition for her from a German ski instructor, Hans. Another friend, David, is gay and wants to lose his virginity. Keaton discovers his sister Jane is pregnant and has no plans to tell the man who might be the father. Keaton also has issues with his friend, Lisa, who wants their relationship to become romantic.

Cast
 Stephen Baldwin as Jon
 Danny Nucci as Dave
 George Newbern as Ian Wickham
 Alison Eastwood as Lisa
 Claudia Schiffer as Carla
 Robert Downey Jr. as Hans
 Neill Barry as Keaton McCarthy
 Suzanne Cryer as Jane McCarthy
 David Rasche as Richard "Richie" Wickham
 Ann Magnuson as Katherine
 Leon as Tyrell

Critical reaction
The film has overwhelmingly negative reviews. Rotten Tomatoes reported that 7% of critics gave positive reviews based on 15 reviews (1 "Fresh", 14 "Rotten") with an average score of 2.2/10, while Roger Ebert considered it not just an example of a bad film, giving it a half star, but incompetent filmmaking, going so far as to suggest in his oral review that it could be shown in film class as an example of what not to do.

Soundtrack
The soundtrack to Friends & Lovers was released on April 20, 1999.

References

External links
 
 
 
 

1999 films
1999 romantic drama films
Lionsgate films
American romantic drama films
American Christmas drama films
Films set in Utah
American skiing films
1990s English-language films
1990s American films